Stéphane Moreau (born 1 January 1971) is a retired French football defender. He is currently U17 manager of Paris Saint-Germain.

Coaching career
After retiring in 2003, Moreau began his coaching career at Stade Laval as a youth coach. In 2004, he took charge of FC Nantes's reserve team and later in 2008 the U18 team at the club.

In June 2009, Moreau returned to Stade Laval as director of the youth sector and later also as U17 manager. In February 2019, he took charge of Stade Laval's reserve team. After 10 years at Laval as director of the youth sector, he left the club in the summer 2019 and was hired as U17 manager for Paris Saint-Germain.

References

1971 births
Living people
French footballers
FC Nantes players
Stade Lavallois players
Stade Malherbe Caen players
Association football defenders
Ligue 1 players
Ligue 2 players